The Kauai Bus is the public transportation service of Kauai County, Hawaii. They operate nine regular local bus routes.

History
The forerunner of the Kauai Bus was a fleet of ten buses managed by the County of Kauai's Office of Elderly Affairs to serve the senior population. In 1990, the first four fixed routes were started between Kapaa and Līhue, and was expanded island-wide in 1992 with Hurricane Iniki recovery funding from the Federal Emergency Management Agency.

The Kauai Bus has a central administration, operations, and maintenance facility at 3220 Hoolako Street in Līhue.

Routes
The Kauai Bus operates six fixed routes; five of those run seven days a week. Three of the routes make up the Mainline service, which runs along the perimeter of the island from Kekaha to Hanalei. Two of the Mainline routes (Kekaha–Līhue, primarily aligned with Route 50 and Hanalei–Līhue, primarily aligned with Route 56) connect in Līhue, and the third (Wailua) duplicates Hanalei–Līhue service between Wailua and Līhue, with additional service along Kuamoo Road within Wailua. The Wailua Mainline is not operated on weekends. The other three routes are Shuttle services, which provide local service within their respective communities (Kalāheo/Kōloa/Poipū, Kapaa/Kapahi, and Līhue).

The mid-day Līhue Lunch Shuttle (Routes 01–12) was discontinued as of April 11, 2016.

The 2018 Short Range Transit Plan proposed splitting the Līhue Shuttle (Route 70) into two separate routes connecting in downtown Līhue. The revised Līhue Shuttle would operate between Lihue Airport and Hanamāulu, and the Puhi Shuttle would operate between Kauai Community College and downtown Līhue. Routes 100E and 150 were discontinued as of October 21, 2018, and the 200E express was discontinued as of January 13, 2019. The October 2018 changes also extended Route 100/200 service (Kekaha – Līhue Mainline) to Līhue Airport and Courthouse, removing those stops from Route 70 (Līhue Shuttle).

Notes

Fares

Regular fares

Passes

Notes

Fleet

Notes

References

See also
TheBus (Honolulu)
Maui Bus

Bus transportation in Hawaii
Transportation in Kauai County, Hawaii
Kauai